Stamford Riverside Festival was an annual music festival in Stamford, Lincolnshire, England. It has been going for over 25 years, previous event names being 'Rock on the Rec', 'Rock on the Meadows' and 'Music on the Meadows'.

The festival provided for genres such as Rock, Punk, Indie, Acoustic and more recently, Dance, and has included artists such as Midget, Enter Shikari, Hazel O'Connor, The Levellers and Blast,

History

The Stamford Riverside Festival began over 25 years ago as 'Rock on the Rec', a small gathering on a recreation ground in Stamford. Following increasing event success, its location was changed to its current position on meadows by the banks of the River Welland, with a name change to 'Music on the Meadows'. In 1999 it was rebranded as the 'Riverside Festival'. A more organised approach to the running of the event included the introduction of more stages and stalls.
Because of the increasing financial strain of running a free festival, and ever-mounting difficulties in obtaining sponsorship, a request was made for a donation from adults on entry. Other changes included the banning of bringing alcohol to the event, in line with police recommendations.

After 3 successive cancellations the organisation began referring to the festival in the past tense. It may never be held again.

Festivals

2009
The 2009 event took place on 4 July and included sets by Neck and Stornoway.

2010
The 3–4 July 2010 festival utilised four stages, and was held over two days to celebrate the festival's 10th anniversary. A 'Road to Riverside' competition to find a local band to play at the event was arranged by festival organisers and the Rutland and Stamford Mercury, and received 670 entries.

The 2010 event included a set by Los Salvadores.

2011 (cancellation)
On 24 December 2010 it was announced that the festival would be cancelled for 2011, through lack of agreement between the organisers and Stamford Town Council over the re-use of the festival site, and the council's concern over previous damage caused, and the organiser's reluctance to provide the council with audited accounts.

A Facebook page was set up in support of the festival. A picnic, promoted by an Internet campaign, was held on the festival date, with a set played by a local band. The picnic was attended by "hundreds of people".

2012 (cancellation)
In 2011 it was confirmed that the festival would return for 2012, and would be a ticket only event limited to 15,000 people. The decision to charge entry was to help with rising costs.

This event, too, had to be cancelled. This time the reason was the flooding of the site during a summer of regular heavy rains. Stamford town council intervened when the site was flooded 2 days before the event was due to start.

2013 (cancellation)
A plan for a substantial festival in 2013 was cancelled because of difficulties over insurance caused by previous year's flooding. By February the insurers had still not settled for the previous year's cancellation and the committee felt that they could not go ahead for 2013.

See also
 List of music festivals in the United Kingdom

References

External links
 detailed listings of each event from 2003 onwards

Music festivals in Lincolnshire
Annual events in the United Kingdom
1999 establishments in England
Recurring events established in 1999
Stamford, Lincolnshire